In Old Oklahoma (reissued as War of the Wildcats) is a 1943 American Western film directed by Albert S. Rogell starring John Wayne and Martha Scott. The film was nominated for two Academy Awards, one for Music Score of a Dramatic or Comedy Picture and the other for Sound Recording (Daniel J. Bloomberg). The supporting cast features George "Gabby" Hayes, Marjorie Rambeau, Dale Evans, Sidney Blackmer as Theodore Roosevelt, and Paul Fix.

Plot
Eastern school teacher Catherine Allen becomes notorious in 1906 when it is learned that she has authored a romance novel. She decides to move west and begin a new life.

On the train, oil man Jim Gardner makes a pass at her. Catherine asks a cowboy, Dan Somers, to sit nearby as a safety measure. Both are on their way to Oklahoma, with stagecoach driver Despirit Dean tagging along with his friend Dan.

Many people in Sapulpa are upset with Jim's business tactics. A farmer feels he was paid too little for his property after Jim discovers oil there. Jim is furious when Dan strongly discourages Chief Big Tree from selling Indian land at too low an offer.

Dan travels to Washington, D.C., to ask President Theodore Roosevelt about oil rights. He fought for Teddy and the Rough Riders a few years before. Teddy offers him a chance to transport thousands of barrels of oil to a Tulsa refinery to win the rights over Jim, which leads to Jim's hired man, the Cherokee Kid, setting off an explosion and sabotaging the trip.

Catherine and Dan fall in love, with hotel owner Bessie Baxter playing matchmaker. A final fistfight between Dan and Jim settles matters once and for all.

Cast
 
John Wayne as Daniel F. Somers
Martha Scott as Catherine Elizabeth Allen
Albert Dekker as Jim "Hunk" Gardner 
George "Gabby" Hayes as Despirit Dean 
Marjorie Rambeau as Bessie Baxter 
Dale Evans as Cuddles Walker 
Grant Withers as Richardson 
Sidney Blackmer as Theodore Roosevelt
Paul Fix as the Cherokee Kid
Cecil Cunningham as Mrs. Ames
Irving Bacon as Ben
Byron Foulger as Wilkins
Anne O'Neal as Mrs. Peabody
Richard Graham as Walter Ames
Tom London as Tom (uncredited) 
Robert Warwick as Chief Big Tree (uncredited)

Production

Development
In December 1941 it was announced Republic Pictures had bought an "oilfield story" War of the Wildcats by Thomson Burtis, as a vehicle for Ray Middleton. They announced it for production in 1942. In December it was announced Frances Hyland was working on the script and that the film would be a vehicle for John Wayne.

The film still took a number of months to move into production. Eleanor Griffin and Ethel Hill were hired to work on the script "which puts the feature in the big league class" according to the Los Angeles Times. They were "to give the story the epic flavor."

The movie was retitled In Old Oklahoma and filming was to start 15 June. Martha Scott was signed for the female lead, which was seen as a coup for Republic because she was associated with prestigious films such as Our Town (1940).

The film was allocated a bigger budget than usual for a Republic Pictures film.

Shooting
Filming took place near Bakersfield.

Parts of the film were shot in Johnson Canyon, Paria, Utah, Cedar City, and Virgin, Utah.

Release
Republic Pictures released it on December 6, 1943.

The film did extremely well at the box office and encouraged Republic to make more bigger budgeted films.

The movie was reissued in 1947 as War of the Wildcats.

Lawsuit
Screenwriter Griffin's ex-husband, William Rankin, later launched a $115,000 lawsuit against Griffin, Hill, Burtis and Republic, alleging the script included elements in three original scripts of his that he submitted to Republic: Indian Territory, Gasoline War, and Fire in Heaven. He alleged that the writers were hired to combine his scripts into the story of In Old Oklahoma but that he received no compensation.

See also
 John Wayne filmography
 Public domain film
 List of American films of 1943
 List of films in the public domain in the United States

References

External links

 
 
 
 
 
 
 
 

1943 films
1943 Western (genre) films
American black-and-white films
American Western (genre) films
1940s English-language films
Films directed by Albert S. Rogell
Films scored by Walter Scharf
Films set in 1906
Films set in Oklahoma
Works about petroleum
Republic Pictures films
Films shot in Utah
Films produced by Robert North
1940s American films